Hasan Mazhar or Hasan Mazhar Bey was a Governor of Ankara in the Ottoman Empire, who refused to participate in the genocide of Armenians in 1915-1917 for which he was dismissed. In 1918, he led the  investigating the crimes of the Armenian genocide.

On November 23, 1918, Sultan Mehmed VI established a government commission of inquiry, Hasan Mazhar Bey was appointed chairman. The commission began to investigate the crimes of Ottoman officials, committed primarily against the representatives of the Armenian population. Mazhar Bey demanded from provincial governors to provide all telegrams with orders for the deportation and killing of Armenians. Despite instructions to destroy the originals of the orders after reading, some officials retained telegrams and the commission was able to obtain them.

The formation of a military tribunal investigating the crimes of the Young Turks was a continuation of the work of the Mazhar Commission, and on December 16, 1918, the sultan formally established such tribunals. Three military tribunals and ten judicial bodies were created in the provinces.

On April 27, 2015, a stone was erected in Warsaw's Righteous Garden to commemorate his person and plant a tree of remembrance.

References 

Witnesses of the Armenian genocide
Political people from the Ottoman Empire
Governors of the Ottoman Empire
Year of birth missing
Year of death missing